Kimper is an unincorporated community in Pike County, Kentucky. Kimper has a post office with ZIP code 41539, which opened on August 8, 1919.

References

Unincorporated communities in Pike County, Kentucky
Unincorporated communities in Kentucky